Veski may refer to:

People
Anne Veski (born 1956), Estonian singer
Johannes Voldemar Veski (1873–1968), Estonian linguist
Viljar Veski (born 1986), Estonian basketball player
Villu Veski (born 1962), Estonian saxophonist and music teacher

Places
Veski, Põlva County, village in Estonia
Veski, Rapla County, village in Estonia
Veski, Vladimir Oblast, village in Russia

Estonian-language surnames